was a town located in Nasu District, Tochigi Prefecture, Japan.

During the Edo period Kurobane developed as the castle town for Kurobane Domain, an 18,000 koku feudal domain under the Tokugawa shogunate. 
  
As of 2003 the town had an estimated population of 16,499 and a density of 87.93 persons per km². The total area was 187.64 km².

On October 1, 2005, Kurobane, along with the village of Yuzukami (also from Nasu District), was merged into the expanded city of Ōtawara.

External links
 Ōtawara official website 

Dissolved municipalities of Tochigi Prefecture